Norway selected its entry for the Eurovision Song Contest 2001 through the Melodi Grand Prix contest, organised by Norsk rikskringkasting (NRK). The winner was Haldor Lægreid with the song "On My Own", who represented Norway at the contest in Copenhagen, Denmark on 12 May 2001.

Before Eurovision

Melodi Grand Prix 2001 
The final took place on 24 February 2001 at the Oslo Spektrum in Oslo, hosted by Hans Christian Andersen. The winner was selected by a combination of regional televoting and a jury panel in two rounds. In the first round, the top four entries were selected to proceed to the second round, the superfinal. The results of the public televote were revealed by Norway's five regions, with the televoting figures of each region being converted to points. The top ten songs received 1–10, 12 and 14 points. The jury panel had a weighting equal to the votes of two televoting regions. In the superfinal, the top four songs from each televoting region received 8, 10, 12 and 14 points. The jury panel again had a weighting equal to the votes of two televoting regions. "On My Own" performed by Haldor Lægreid was the winner at the conclusion of the voting. The jury consisted of Jostein Pedersen, Cecilie Bjelke, Inger Beate Jacobsen, Jarl Aanestad and Hege Tepstad.

Competing entries

Final

At Eurovision
Haldor Lægreid performed 4th on the night of the contest, following Bosnia and Herzegovina and preceding Israel. Norway finished with 3 points, finishing joint last of 23 entries with Iceland, and thus relegating Norway from taking part in the 2002 Contest.

Voting

References

External links
Norwegian National Final 2003
Songs of Melodi Grand Prix 2001 (in Norwegian) NRK

2001
Countries in the Eurovision Song Contest 2001
2001
Eurovision
Eurovision